Sadhupul is a small village in (dhalta) Himachal Pradesh between Solan and Chail, located at the site of a small bridge constructed over the hill river "Ashwini". On 23 August 2014 this bridge collapsed, when an overloaded truck tried to cross it.
A New bridge has been constructed and dedicated to people in January 2018.

Water Park Cafe
A water park was inaugurated on 30 June 2017 by CM.

References

Villages in Solan district